NQEA Pty Ltd is an engineering and shipbuilding company based in Cairns, Australia. The company was founded in 1948 as an engineering supply company named North Queensland Engineers & Agents, then expanded in 1966 into shipbuilding and was renamed.

NQEA has built several ships for the Royal Australian Navy (including the Fremantle-class patrol boats and Leeuwin-class survey ships). The company was contracted to build modules to form the hulls of the Hobart-class air warfare destroyer project in May 2009, but lost the contract a month later to BAE Systems Australia after admissions that an internal restructuring may lead to difficulties meeting the contracted obligations.

The company has also built catamaran ferries for the State Transit Authority (now operated by Sydney Ferries), London based Thames Clippers, and operators in French Polynesia and the Netherlands.

Ships built

References

Companies based in Queensland
Engineering companies of Australia
Shipbuilding companies of Australia
Shipyards of Australia
1948 establishments in Australia